Sarakina is a village and a community of the Lagkadas municipality. Before the 2011 local government reform it was part of the municipality of Kallindoia, of which it was a municipal district. The 2011 census recorded 71 inhabitants in the village and 149 inhabitants in the community of Sarakina. The community of Sarakina covers an area of 16.562 km2.

Administrative division
The community of Sarakina consists of two separate settlements: 
Agios Charalambos (population 78)
Sarakina (population 71)
The aforementioned population figures are as of 2011.

See also
List of settlements in the Thessaloniki regional unit

References

Populated places in Thessaloniki (regional unit)